The women's middleweight (60 kg/132 lbs) Full-Contact category at the W.A.K.O. European Championships 2004 in Budva was the fourth heaviest of the female Full-Contact tournaments and involved eight fighters.  Each of the matches was three rounds of two minutes each and were fought under Full-Contact kickboxing rules.

The tournament gold medal was won by Cindy Orain from France who defeated Nadine Lemke of Germany in the final by split decision.  Defeated semi finalists Monika Florek from Poland and Vera Avdeeva from Russia gained bronze medals for their efforts.

Results

Key

See also
List of WAKO Amateur European Championships
List of WAKO Amateur World Championships
List of female kickboxers

References

External links
 WAKO World Association of Kickboxing Organizations Official Site

W.A.K.O. European Championships 2004 (Budva)